Maasim, officially the Municipality of Maasim (Jawi: ايڠايد نو معسيم), is a 1st class municipality in the province of Sarangani, Philippines. According to 2020 census, it had a population of 64,940 people.

Geography

Barangays
Maasim is politically subdivided into 16 barangays.

Climate

Demographics

The majority of the population are Moro and Lumad origin. One of the indigenous peoples living in mountainous areas of Maasim is known as Bla'an.

Economy 

The economy of Maasim is largely based on agriculture with a high level production of copra (dried coconut meat). Animal husbandry is the second biggest income earner, notably cattle farming. Other agricultural products are coconuts, maize, sugarcane, bananas, pineapples, mangoes, eggs, beef, and fish.

The economy has accelerated in the past decade, driven by advances in global communication technology and the finishing of a modern highway that greatly improved trade and transport.

Kamanga Power Plant
KPP announced on June 3, 2008, that Alcantara-controlled Conal Holdings Co. would build in mid-2009 the $450 million 200-megawatt clean coal Kamanga Power Plant, in Maasim, Saranggani. The plant was expected to supply part of Mindanao's baseload power requirements when it is operational in 2012.

References

External links
Maasim Profile at PhilAtlas.com
  Maasim Profile at the DTI Cities and Municipalities Competitive Index
Maasim Municipal Profile at the Province of Sarangani official website
[ Philippine Standard Geographic Code]
Philippine Census Information
Local Governance Performance Management System

Municipalities of Sarangani
Enclaves and exclaves